was a Japanese video game developer created by Kenichi Nishi in 1995. Many of its personnel were former Square employees. The firm folded in 2000 after creating three games. Many employees went on to work for other small and independent gaming businesses, including skip Ltd., Vanpool, and Punchline. 

Former staff members Yoshiro Kimura, Kazuyuki Kurashima, and Hirofumi Taniguchi currently manage the game company Onion Games, which brought Moon: Remix RPG Adventure to the Nintendo Switch, Windows, and PlayStation 4, as well as publishing it in English for the first time.

The name "Love-de-Lic" was inspired by Nishi's love for Yellow Magic Orchestra, notably the album Technodelic.

Games 
 Moon: Remix RPG Adventure (1997, PlayStation, Nintendo Switch, Windows, PS4)
 UFO: A Day in the Life (1999, PlayStation)
 L.O.L.: Lack of Love (2000, Dreamcast)

Staff 
Kenichi Nishi
Taro Kudou
Akira Ueda
Yoshiro Kimura
Keita Eto
Kurashima Kazuyuki
Hirofumi Taniguchi
Hiroshi Suzuki

References

External links 
 (web archive 
Vanpool Games (in Japanese)
Punchline Games (web archive) (in Japanese)

Defunct video game companies of Japan
Video game companies established in 1995
Video game companies disestablished in 2000
Video game development companies
Japanese companies disestablished in 2000
Japanese companies established in 1995